Colin Gooddy (1933-2019) was an international speedway rider from England and Great Britain.

Speedway career 
Gooddy rode in the top tier of British Speedway from 1955-1977, riding for various clubs. He was capped by England once. He reached the final of the British Speedway Championship in 1965.

References 

1933 births
2019 deaths
British speedway riders
Cradley Heathens riders
Crayford Kestrels riders
Eastbourne Eagles riders
Exeter Falcons riders
Ipswich Witches riders
Oxford Cheetahs riders
Poole Pirates riders
Rayleigh Rockets riders
People from Blackheath, London